Alexander Morrison, CVO, QPM, (28 August 1927 - 8 July 2018) was a senior Scottish police officer in the last decades of the 20th century.

A native of Lewis, he was Chief Constable of Aberdeen City Police from 1970 to 1975, Grampian Police from 1975 to 1983 then HM Chief Inspector of Constabulary for Scotland from 1983 to 1988.

Notes

Scottish police officers
Officers in Scottish police forces
Chief Inspectors of Constabulary (Scotland)
Law enforcement in Scotland
Commanders of the Order of the British Empire
Scottish recipients of the Queen's Police Medal
British Chief Constables
1927 births
2018 deaths
People from the Isle of Lewis